Dong Yi is a 2010 South Korean historical television series starring Han Hyo-joo in the title role, along with Ji Jin-hee, Lee So-yeon and Bae Soo-bin. The series centers on the love story between King Sukjong and Choe Suk-bin. It aired from 22 March to 12 October 2010 on MBC TV's Mondays and Tuesdays at 21:55 time slot for 60 episodes.

Dong Yi was a hit across Asia and recorded the highest ratings for Korean dramas on Japanese network NHK. It also recorded solid viewership ratings in the mid-20% to 30% range in South Korea, and Han won acting awards for her performance including Daesang (Grand Prize) at the MBC Drama Awards.

Plot

Childhood 
Set during the reign of King Sukjong in the Joseon dynasty, the series is based on real-life historical figure Choe Suk-bin.

Dong-yi's father and brother are members of the Sword Fraternity, which is wrongfully accused of murdering noblemen. She hides her identity and enters the palace as a servant for the Bureau of Music, determined to reveal her family's innocence and find the true orchestrators of the noblemen's deaths.

As a court lady inspector 
Dong-yi rises from the humble position of a servant to a court lady inspector through her shrewd investigative skills and relentless drive for justice.

The court is split between the Westerners faction (backed by the Queen Dowager and Queen Min) and the Southerners faction (backed by the King's favored concubine, Jang Ok-jeong). Unaware of his true identity, Dong-yi befriends the King and becomes his trusted confidante.

Originally, Dong-yi admires Ok-jeong on the basis that both are clever, ambitious women from the common classes. However, she is horrified to realize that Jang Ok-jeong and her brother, Jang Hee-jae, are poisoning the Queen Dowager for refusing to acknowledge Ok-jeong as a royal concubine. They also frame the innocent Queen Min for the Queen Dowager's death with false proof.

Queen Min is stripped of her title and exiled to the countryside. Jang Ok-jeong takes her place as the Queen, and her son, Yi Yun, is declared Crown Prince. The Southerners are more powerful than ever. Dong-yi vows to find the evidence that proves the Deposed Queen's innocence and bring her back into the palace.

While investigating the Royal Treasury, Dong-yi discovers proof that Jang Hee-jae bribed officials and apothecaries to frame Queen Min. Before she can bring this evidence to the King, Dong-yi is gravely injured by Jang Hee-jae's assassins.

She hides in a distant province as she recuperates her health. There, she discovers that Jang Hee-jae is involved in a conspiracy with the Qing envoys: in exchange for the Emperor's approval of Crown Prince Yun, Hee-jae will give them military records of the Joseon border.

Dong-yi escapes Hee-jae and returns to the capital with proof that he planned to expose matters of state interest to a foreign government. The King is overjoyed to see her again, and he realizes that he is in love with her.

As royal consort 
Despite her commoner status, Dong-yi is brought into the court as the King's concubine. Through her new position, she exposes that Queen Jang, her brother and the Southerners faction had contrived to sell state secrets to the Qing envoys to strengthen the position of Crown Prince Yun. Jang Hee-jae and the majority of the Southerners are stripped of their courtly titles and exiled. Ok-jeong should also be exiled; however, as the mother of the Crown Prince, she is merely demoted to her previous rank of concubine of the first class (Hui-bin). Lady Min is declared innocent and returns to the inner court as Queen.

Dong-yi is highly favored by the Queen for proving her innocence and convincing the King to reinstate her to her former position. She declared Dong-yi a concubine of the fourth junior rank and an official member of the royal family. Dong-yi gives birth to the King's second son, Prince Yeongsu, who unfortunately dies of smallpox a few months later.

The new Sword Guild and the past exposed 
The Sword Fraternity is resurrected. Unlike their former iteration, they are violent and murder nobles who are involved in corruption and cause the commoners to suffer. Dong-yi fears that her identity as a traitor's daughter will be exposed, and she decides to investigate. She learns that the leader of the fraternity is her old childhood friend, Gae-dwo-ra. She realizes that Lord Oh Tae-suk had murdered his fellow Southerners in order to consolidate power and had blamed the Sword Fraternity, resulting in the death of her father and brother.

Jang Mu-yeol, a Southerner police chief, realizes the unusual connection between Dong-yi and the Sword Fraternity, and uses it to supplant Oh Tae-suk as the head of the Southerners faction and remove Hui-bin's enemy, Dong-yi. He murders Oh Tae-suk and blames the Sword Fraternity for his death, and traps Dong-yi into trying to help the injured Gae-dwo-ra.

The King and the court realize Dong-yi's true past and identity. She is charged with being a traitor's daughter, hiding her identity, and helping a rebel group. The Southerners petition to have her executed, but the King merely exiles her from the palace.

In exile 
The King is heartbroken by his separation from Dong-yi. Despite being forbidden to do so, he goes to her residence and spends the night with her. She gives birth to her second child, Yi Geum.

The six-year-old Geum is bright and intelligent, but he longs to meet his father. On an undercover outing, the King recognizes Geum as his son and befriends him, posing as an administrative officer.

Hui-bin learns about the King's secret meetings with Yi Geum and his lingering affection for Dong-yi. Her mother hires assassins to burn Dong-yi's residence in order to kill her and her son. The royal guards, who were instructed to watch over the residence, rescue both mother and son from the fire.

The King has been waiting to bring Dong-yi and her son to court. When Geum turns seven, he is required to receive royal education. However, the King uses the failed assassination attempt on the pair's lives as a pretext to bring both into the palace early.

Return to the palace 
Many members of the court seek to promote Geum (now titled Prince Yeoning) as Crown Prince, replacing Hui-bin's son. Queen Min, who has no children of her own, adores him and supports his claim. However, she suddenly dies of an illness.

Rumors spread throughout the palace that Crown Prince Yun is infertile due to an undisclosed condition. If so, Prince Yeoning would be the natural alternative to be the King's heir. Hui-bin's supporters begin to abandon her and the Crown Prince in favor of Dong-yi and her son.

Desperate to retain her son's position, Hui-bin attempts to assassinate Dong-yi and Yeoning. Dong-yi is injured, but the prince is unharmed.

The King executes Hui-bin for using black magic to kill the Queen, hiding Crown Prince Yun's infertility, and attempting to kill Dong-yi and Prince Yeoning. Before her execution, Hui-bin acknowledges her wrongs and begs Dong-yi to protect the Crown Prince.

The king offers for Dong-yi to become Queen and Geum to become the Crown Prince. However, Dong-yi refuses. She cites all the chaos Hui-bin has caused in court, and she asks the King to create a law preventing concubines from becoming Queen in hopes that similar power struggles do not occur. The King agrees and appoints Lady Kim as Queen.

The King knows that Crown Prince Yun will always regard his half-brother Prince Yeoning as a threat. For both to survive, both must become Kings. Because the Crown Prince is infertile, he will rule first after the King; Geum will follow him. Because Geum has a commoner mother, the King knows that the courtiers will not respect his position, so he decides to abdicate so that Yi Yun would become King and Yi Geum will be cemented as the Crown Prince. However, Queen Kim adopts Yeoning, giving him royal protection and ensuring that he will follow Crown Prince Yun to the throne after his death.

Dong-yi decides to leave the palace so that she can help the poor commoners.

A new King 
Dong-yi's son later becomes the 21st monarch of Joseon, King Yeongjo, the father of Crown Prince Sado and grandfather of Yi San.

Cast

Main 
Han Hyo-joo as Choe Dong-yi, Royal Noble Consort Suk
Kim Yoo-jung as young Choe Dong-yi
Ji Jin-hee as King Sukjong
Lee So-yeon as Jang Ok-jeong, Royal Noble Consort Hui
Bae Soo-bin as Cha Chun-soo
Park Ha-sun as Queen Min
Jung Jin-young as Seo Young-gi

Supporting
Jung Dong-hwan as Oh Tae-suk
Lee Kye-in as Oh Tae-poong
Choi Cheol-ho as Oh Yoon
Kim Yu-seok as Jang Hee-jae
Son Il-kwon as Hong Tae-yoon
Shin Guk as Royal Secretary
Na Sung-kyoon as Jung In-gook
Kim Dong-yoon as Shim Woon-taek
Park Jung-soo as Queen Dowager Hyeonryeol
Kim Hyeseon as Court Lady Jung
Kim So-yi as Court Lady Bong
Ahn Yeo-jin as Court Lady Jo
Lim Sung-min as Court Lady Yoo
Jeong Yu-mi as Jung-eum
Kang Yoo-mi as Ae-jong
Oh Eun-ho as Shi-bi
Han Da-min as Eun-geum
Choi Ha-na as Mi-ji
Lee Jung-hoon as Lee Jong-ok
Choi Jae-ho as Park Do-soo
Yeo Ho-min as Oh Ho-yang
Lee Hee-do as Hwang Joo-shik
Lee Kwang-soo as Park Yeong-dal
Jung Sung-woon as Choe Dong-joo
Jung In-gi as Kim Hwan
Jung Ki-sung as Kim Hwan's disciple
Lee Sook as Lady Park
Kim Hye-jin as Seol-hee
Choi Ran as Lady Yun
Yeo Hyun-soo as Gae-dwo-ra
Choi Soo-han as young Gae-dwo-ra
Jung Eun-pyo as Gae-dwo-ra's father
Jung Sun-il as Park Doo-kyung
Kwon Min as Cha Soo-taek
Choi Jong-hwan as Jang Mu-yeol
Lee Hyung-suk as Yi Geum, Prince Yeoning
Lee Seon-ho as King Yeongjo
Shin Gyu-ri as Seo Hye-in, Princess Consort Dalseong
Jung Mo-rye as Queen Jeongseong
Yoon Chan as Crown Prince Yi Yun
Heo Yi-seul as Young-sun
Maeng Sang-hoon as Kim Goo-sun
Oh Yeon-seo as Queen Kim
Nam Da-reum as Prince Eunpyeong
Chun Ho-jin as Choe Hyo-won
Lee Jae-yong as Jang Ik-heon
Choi Il-hwa as Seo Jung-ho
Kim Ji-hoon as tge child of an aristocrat

Production
Dong Yi was written by Kim Yi-young and directed by Lee Byung-hoon. Lee previously directed the hit 2003 period drama Jewel in the Palace.

It was filmed at Yongin Daejanggeum Park located at Cheoin District, Yongin in Gyeonggi Province, where other historical dramas such as Moon Embracing the Sun, Jumong and Queen Seondeok were also filmed.

Ratings
In the table below,  represent the lowest ratings and  represent the highest ratings.

Awards
 2010 3rd Korea Drama Awards
 Best Actress: Han Hyo-joo
 Best Supporting Actor: Jung Dong-hwan
 Achievement Award: Lee Byung-hoon

 2010 MBC Drama Awards
 Daesang (Grand Prize): Han Hyo-joo
 Top Excellence Award, Actor: Ji Jin-hee
 Excellence Award, Actress: Lee So-yeon
 Best New Actress: Park Ha-sun
 Golden Acting Award, Supporting Actor: Kim Yu-seok
 Best Young Actor: Kim Yoo-jung, Lee Hyung-suk
 Popularity Award, Actress: Han Hyo-joo
 Viewer's Favorite Drama of the Year: Dong Yi

 2011 1st Hong Kong Cable TV Awards
 Best Drama
 Best Actor: Ji Jin-hee
 Best Actress: Han Hyo-joo

 2011 47th Baeksang Arts Awards 
 Best Actress (TV): Han Hyo-joo

References

External links
  
 Dong Yi at MBC Global Media
 
  
 Dong Yi on NHK 

South Korean historical television series
Television series set in the Joseon dynasty
MBC TV television dramas
2010 South Korean television series debuts
2010 South Korean television series endings
Korean-language television shows